Al-Ummah ( is an Egyptian newspaper issued by the Umma Party with the approval of the Supreme Press Council. It was founded by Ahmed El-Sabahi, the Party's founder, at the same time as the Party itself in 1983 and was published weekly for 26 years, until a 2009-17 lacuna due to the Financial crisis of 2007–2008. In 2017, it returned with journalist Saeed Zeinhom as Editor and a Board of Director headed by Councilor Maher Muhanna, the Party's Secretary-General. In 2021, the editorial body was again restructured, with columnist Iman Mansour appointed editor-in-chief.

References

External links

 

1983 establishments in Egypt
Arabic-language newspapers
Newspapers published in Cairo
Publications established in 1983
Weekly newspapers published in Egypt